is a Japanese voice actor affiliated with Aksent. He is known for dubbing Lee Byung-hun and also voiced Narcistole in Delicious Party Pretty Cure.

Filmography

Anime series
Big Windup! (Riki Kajiyama, Takashima)
Captain Tsubasa  (Teppi Kisugi (youth))
Delicious Party Precure (Narcistole)
Digimon Fusion  (Hideaki Mashimo)
Dragon Quest: The Adventure of Dai (Apollo)
Fairy Tail (Mest Gryder/Dranbalt)
Fighting Beauty Wulong (Masao Ōba)
Fullmetal Alchemist: Brotherhood (Mason)
Gallery Fake (Detective)
Great Pretender (Liu Xiao)
Guilty Crown (Hirohide Nanba)
Ikkitousen (Kakouton Genjou)
Inazuma Eleven (Jousuke Tsunami)
Initial D (Hiroya Okuyama)
Iron Man: Rise of Technovore (Clint Barton/Hawkeye)
Itazura Na Kiss (Kinnosuke Nakamura)
Junji Ito Collection (Tetsurō Mukoda)
Marvel Anime: Iron Man (Kawashima)
Midori Days (Gangster)
Naruto: Shippuden (Jugo)
Oscar's Oasis (Harchi)
Pani Poni Dash! (Narrator)
Saiyuki Reload (Demon)
Samurai Gun (Satoshi Ichigawa)
SD Gundam Sangokuden Brave Battle Warriors (Choushuu Britova)
Smile PreCure! (Yūichi Kise)
The Aquatope on White Sand (Bondo Garandо̄)
Tokyo Majin (Alan Claude)
Yakitate!! Japan (Kawachi)
Yashahime: Princess Half-Demon (Goro)

Anime films
Inazuma Eleven GO vs. Danbōru Senki W (2012) (Jousuke Tsunami)

Video games

Dubbing roles

Live-action
Lee Byung-hun
G.I. Joe: The Rise of Cobra – Storm Shadow
I Come with the Rain – Su Dongpo
Masquerade – King Gwanghae/Ha-sun
G.I. Joe: Retaliation – Storm Shadow
Red 2 – Han Cho Bai
Terminator Genisys – T-1000
Inside Men – Ahn Sang-goo
The Magnificent Seven – Billy Rocks
The Age of Shadows – Jung Chae-san
Master – President Jin
The Fortress – Choi Myung-kil
Keys to the Heart – Jo-ha
Ashfall – Lee Joon-pyeong
Chris Pine
Star Trek – James T. Kirk
Unstoppable – Will Colson
Star Trek Into Darkness – James T. Kirk
Horrible Bosses 2 – Rex Hanson
Jack Ryan: Shadow Recruit – Jack Ryan
Stretch – Karos
Z for Zachariah – Caleb
Star Trek Beyond – Captain James T. Kirk
Hell or High Water – Toby Howard
The Contractor – James Harper
5 Days of War (Thomas Anders (Rupert Friend))
90 Minutes in Heaven (Don Piper (Hayden Christensen))
90120 (Ethan Ward (Dustin Milligan))
The Accountant (Braxton Wolff (Jon Bernthal))
Aloha (Brian Gilcrest (Bradley Cooper))
Alone in the Dark II (Edward Carnby (Rick Yune))
American Sniper (Ryan "Biggles" Job (Jake McDorman))
Army of Thieves (Brad Cage (Stuart Martin))
Baggage Claim (Sam (Adam Brody))
Bates Motel (Dylan Massett (Max Thieriot))
Blades of Glory (James "Jimmy" MacElroy (Jon Heder))
Breakthrough (Pastor Jason Noble (Topher Grace))
Bullet Train (Yuichi Kimura / The Father (Andrew Koji))
Bulletproof Monk (Kar (Seann William Scott))
Chapter 27 (Mark David Chapman (Jared Leto))
Chronicle (Matt Garetty (Alex Russell))
The 1st Shop of Coffee Prince (Hwang Min-yeop (Lee Eon))
Criminal Minds (Luke Alvez (Adam Rodriguez))
Crimson Peak (Dr. Alan McMichael (Charlie Hunnam))
The Dangerous Lives of Altar Boys (Donny Flynn)
Dead Man Down (Victor (Colin Farrell))
The Double (Ben Geary (Topher Grace))
Dr. Dolittle: Tail to the Chief (Cole Fletcher (Niall Matter))
Dumbo (Neils Skellig (Joseph Gatt))
East of Eden (Lee Dong-wook (Yeon Jung-hoon))
Eight Legged Freaks (Bret (Matt Czuchry))
Ender's Game (Peter Wiggin (Jimmy Pinchak))
Fantastic Four (Victor Von Doom / Dr. Doom (Toby Kebbell))
The Gifted (Marcos Diaz / Eclipse (Sean Teale))
Gilmore Girls (Jess Mariano (Milo Ventimiglia))
Gossip Girl (Chuck Bass (Ed Westwick))
Gotham (Oswald "Penguin" Cobblepot (Robin Lord Taylor), Jason Lennon/The Ogre (Milo Ventimiglia))
Heroes (Peter Petrelli (Milo Ventimiglia))
Hostel (Paxton (Jay Hernandez))
Hostel: Part II (Paxton (Jay Hernandez))
Hostel: Part III (Carter (Kip Pardue))
I Am Number Four (Mark James (Jake Abel))
iCarly (Spencer Shay (Jerry Trainor))
The Illusionist (Eisenheim (Edward Norton))
In Bruges (Eirik (Jérémie Renier))
In the Name of the King (Basstian (Will Sanderson))
Infamous Second Son (Delsin Rowe)
The Internship (Graham Hawtrey (Max Minghella))
Joy Ride 3: Roadkill (Jordon Wells (Jesse Hutch))
Jumper (Griffin O'Connor (Jamie Bell))
A Knight's Tale (William Thatcher (Heath Ledger))
Letters to Juliet (Charlie Wyman (Christopher Egan))
The Little Things (Albert Sparma (Jared Leto))
Love (Lee Miller (Gunner Wright))
Lucifer (Detective Daniel Espinoza (Kevin Alejandro))
Maleficent (Diaval (Sam Riley))
The Mandalorian (The Mandalorian (Pedro Pascal)
Mary Magdalene (Judas (Tahar Rahim))
Mission: Impossible III (Rick Meade (Aaron Paul))
Mr. Mercedes (Morris Bellamy (Gabriel Ebert))
My Blind Date with Life (Max (Jacob Matschenz))
The November Man (David Mason (Luke Bracey))
Ouija (Trevor (Daren Kagasoff))
Pathology (Dr. Ted Grey (Milo Ventimiglia))
Platoon (2003 TV Tokyo edition) (Morehouse)
Point Break (Johnny Utah (Luke Bracey))
Pride and Prejudice and Zombies (Fitzwilliam Darcy (Sam Riley))
Prince of Persia: The Sands of Time (Bis (Reece Ritchie))
P.S. I Love You (Daniel Connelly (Harry Connick Jr.))
Rambo (School Boy (Matthew Marsden))
Ready or Not (Daniel Le Domas (Adam Brody))
Really Love (Yusef Davis (Michael Ealy))
Red Dawn (Matt Eckert (Josh Peck))
Rise of the Planet of the Apes (Dodge Landon (Tom Felton))
Secret Sunshine (Lee Min-ki (Kim Young-jae))
Sense8 (Wolfgang Bogdanow (Max Riemelt))
Suits (Alex Williams (Dulé Hill))
Take Me Home Tonight (Kyle Masterson (Chris Pratt))
Thor (Hawkeye (Jeremy Renner))
Top Gun (2005 NTV edition) (LTJG Leonard "Wolfman" Wolfe (Barry Tubb))
Torchwood (Ianto Jones (Gareth David-Lloyd))
The Town (James "Jem" Coughlin (Jeremy Renner))
Transformers: Revenge of the Fallen (Leo Spitz (Ramón Rodríguez))
Twilight film series (Alec (Cameron Bright))
The Twilight Saga: Breaking Dawn – Part 2
The Twilight Saga: Eclipse
The Twilight Saga: New Moon
The Unborn (Mark Hardigan (Cam Gigandet))
Veronica Mars (Wallace Fennel (Percy Daggs III))
Until Dawn (Josh Washington (Rami Malek))
War for the Planet of the Apes (Preacher (Gabriel Chavarria))
Wild Things: Foursome (Carson Wheetly (Ashley Parker Angel))
Wind River (Cory Lambert (Jeremy Renner))
Winter's Tale (Peter Lake (Colin Farrell))
ZeroZeroZero (Manuel Quinteras (Harold Torres))

Animation
Avengers Assemble (Scott Lang / Ant-Man)
Batman Beyond (Willie Watt)
Codename: Kids Next Door (Numbuh 5 / Abigail "Abby" Lincoln)
Foster's Home for Imaginary Friends (Wilt)
The Nut Job (Surly)
ReBoot (Hack)
Star Wars: Clone Wars (Sha'A Gi)
Spider-Man: The Animated Series (Harry Osborn)
Thor: Tales of Asgard (Fandral)
X-Men: Evolution (Quicksilver, Berzerker)

References

External links
Official site 
 

Japanese male video game actors
Japanese male voice actors
Male voice actors from Osaka Prefecture
1977 births
Living people
20th-century Japanese male actors
21st-century Japanese male actors